The 1967–68 season was Liverpool Football Club's 76th season in existence and their sixth consecutive season in the First Division. Liverpool did not win any major trophies for the second season in a row. Despite top scorer Roger Hunt performing well, Liverpool finished three points behind champions Manchester City, while rivals Manchester United would later beat Liverpool to the honour of being the first English club to win the European Cup.

Squad

Goalkeepers
  Ray Clemence
  Tommy Lawrence

Defenders
  Gerry Byrne
  Chris Lawler
  Ian Ross
  Tommy Smith
  Peter Wall
  Ron Yeats

Midfielders
  Alf Arrowsmith
  Ian Callaghan
  Emlyn Hughes
  Doug Livermore
  Peter Wall
  Stuart Mason
  Willie Stevenson
  Ian St. John
  Gordon Wallace
  Peter Thompson
  David Wilson

Attackers
  Bobby Graham
  Tony Hateley
  Roger Hunt

League table

Results

First Division

Football League Cup

FA Cup

Inter-Cities Fairs Cup

References
 LFC History.net – 1967-68 season
 Liverweb - 1967-68 Season

Liverpool F.C. seasons
Liverpool